Scrobipalpa moghrebanella is a moth in the family Gelechiidae. It was described by Daniel Lucas in 1937. It is found in Morocco.

References

Scrobipalpa
Moths described in 1937